The Sindh Judicial Academy is an agency of the government of Sindh in Karachi for legal training. The Academy was established in 1992 under Sindh Judicial Academy Act, 1993 passed by Sindh Assembly. The Academy provides pre-service and in-service training to the judicial officers and court personnel. The management and administration of the Academy are run by the board under leadership of the Chief Justice of Sindh High Court and an appointed Director-General.

See also 
 Federal Judicial Academy
 Khyber Pakhtunkhwa Judicial Academy
 Punjab Judicial Academy
 Balochistan Judicial Academy
 Gilgit-Baltistan Judicial Academy

References

External links 
 Sindh Judicial Academy

Legal organizations based in Pakistan
1993 establishments in Pakistan
Government agencies of Sindh